Mexican town or Mexican Town may refer to:

 Municipalities of Mexico
 Mexican Town, Arizona, an area now part of Ajo
 Mexicantown, Detroit

See also 
 , any of several localities